Katinka Hosszú (born 3 May 1989) is a Hungarian competitive swimmer specialized in individual medley events. She is a three-time Olympic champion and a nine-time long-course world champion. She is owner of a Budapest based swim school and swim club called Iron Swim Budapest, and co-owner and captain of Team Iron, founding member of the International Swimming League.

Hosszú is the current world record holder in 100-meter individual medley, 200-meter individual medley (long course and short course), 400-meter individual medley (long course) and 200-meter backstroke (short course). She was the first swimmer (male or female) to hold world records in all five individual medley events at the same time. She holds two-thirds of the Hungarian national records. Hosszu was named FINA Swimmer of the Year in 2014, 2015, 2016 and 2018, and won SwimSwam's Swammy Award for Female Swimmer of the Year in 2013.

She has competed at five Summer Olympics: 2004, 2008, 2012, 2016, and 2020. Hosszú currently swims for her own team, Team Iron Swim Budapest. After a long tenure under head coach Shane Tusup, who was her husband, following their divorce Hosszú was coached by Dave Salo before moving onto Árpád Petrov. At the end of 2019 she parted ways with Petrov, and by the following year had hired József Nagy  to be her coach.

She is one of the most versatile swimmers in the world, and was nicknamed the "Iron Lady", which she has since turned into a fast growing international brand. In 2014 she became the first race-prize dollar millionaire (man or woman) in swimming history.

According to Forbes magazine she is considered the most valuable Hungarian athlete, ranking the first position for the last five years.

Personal life
Katinka Hosszú was born in Pécs, Hungary, the daughter of Barbara Bakos and István Hosszú. She is the youngest of three (Gergely and Ádám). Katinka grew up in Baja and was coached in swimming by her grandfather, László Bakos until the age of 13. Hosszú met her future husband Shane Tusup in 2009, when they were both freshmen at the University of Southern California. After being crushed under the pressure of expectations at the 2012 London Olympics and not medalling, she asked her then boyfriend Tusup to become her coach, replacing her coach since her U.S.C. swim team days, Dave Salo. After the Olympics, at the Beijing World Cup swim meet, she competed in 8 events, medalling in 5 of them, leading to Chinese newspapers says she was made out of iron, leading to her nickname, The Iron Lady. Hosszú married Tusup in 2013.

In August 2016, Hosszú lost a defamation lawsuit against writer Casey Barrett, magazine Swimming World, and publisher Sports Publications International, Incorporated. She had filed the lawsuit in November 2015 after the magazine published an article on its website in May 2015 questioning whether Hosszú was using performance-enhancing substances, despite Hosszú never having been found to use such substances. The lawsuit was dismissed because the judge ruled the article to clearly be an opinion piece. Hosszú and husband Tusup opened their own swim club in Hungary, Iron Aquatics in September 2016.

On 16 February 2018 Hosszú filed for divorce from Tusup. On 25 May 2018 Hosszú's Facebook page was deleted by Tusup, who was the sole administrator of the page. However, on 6 June 2018 she regained access to her Facebook page with the assistance of activist and women's rights defender Matan Uziel.

In January 2022, Hosszú announced her engagement to her boyfriend since 2019, Máté Gelencsér. Later in the year, a biographical film entitled "Katinka", which portrays her life, was released in theaters.

Swimming career
Hosszú is renowned throughout the swimming world for swimming many events well in a short space of time. During the third leg of the 2014 FINA/MASTBANK Swimming World Cup, organised in the Victoria Park Swimming Pool of Hong Kong, she got an unprecedented achievement winning 12 medals out of the 17 individual events for the two-day meet. 10 gold (200m, 400m and 800m free, 50m, 100m and 200m backstroke, 200m butterfly, 100m, 200m and 400m individual medley) and 2 silver (50m free and 50m butterfly).

Hosszú is an active part of the swimming community as well. She is one of those 30 swimmers who have founded the Global Association of Professional Swimmers in 2017. She is also working on reforming swimming as an entertainment by being the ambassador for the International Swimming League, a new initiative with the aim of organizing and reorganizing swimming competitions.

2004

2004 Summer Olympics

Hosszú made her international debut at the age of 15 representing Hungary at the 2004 Summer Olympics where she competed in a single event 200-meter freestyle finishing in position number 31 (2:04.22).

2004 European Short Course Swimming Championships
She won her first medal at the 2004 European Short Course Swimming Championships, a bronze in the 400-meter individual medley (4:35,41).

2005 European Junior Swimming Championships
At the 2005 European Junior Swimming Championships held in Budapest she won three gold medals in 200m freestyle, 400m individual medley and the 4×100m freestyle relay. Two silver medals in 400m freestyle and the 4×200m freestyle relay. And a bronze medal in the 800m freestyle.

2008 European Championships
She won her first long course medal at the 2008 European Championships, a silver in 400-meter individual medley (4:37.43).

2009 World Championships

At the 2009 World Championships she won two bronze medals in the 200-meter individual medley and 200-meter butterfly before becoming World Champion in the 400-meter individual medley. She was elected Hungarian Sportswoman of the Year for her achievements.

2010 European Championships
At the 2010 European Championships held in her home country, she won a silver medal in 400 m medley and became European Champion in 200 m butterfly, 200 m medley and as a member of the 4 × 200 m freestyle relay team.

2011 NCAA Championships

In 2011 Hosszú had one of the finest seasons in college history winning 3 individual National Championships: 200y IM (1:53.39), 400y IM (3:59.75) and 200y fly (1:51.69). She was named Pac-10 Swimmer of the Year, CSCAA Swimmer of the Year and got the Honda Sports Award in swimming and diving, designating her as the nation's top collegiate female athlete for this year in this sport.

2012 Summer Olympics

Competing in the 2012 Summer Olympics, she finished fourth in the 400-meter individual medley with a time of 4:33.49, just outside of the medals. She also finished eighth in the 200-meter individual medley and missed the finals for the 200-meter butterfly.

Despite that after the disappointment at the 2012 London Olympics, Tamás Gyárfás, the then president of the Hungarian Swimming Association even advised her to retire, she decided not to give up her swimming career and since then she has been coached by her husband Shane Tusup, a former American professional swimmer himself.

2013
In 2013, Hosszú set out to redeem herself after her medal-less performance at the 2012 Olympics. She attended numerous competitions and swam highly rigorous programs at each one, earning herself the nickname of the "Iron Lady". She earned three medals (two gold, one bronze) at the World Championships and a gold and two silvers at the European Championships. She also amassed a total of 24 golds and broke 6 world records during the World Cup series.

2013 World Championships

At the 2013 World Championships, she pulled out of the 100 m backstroke after qualifying second in the heats (preliminary races), to concentrate on the final of the 200 m individual medley which she subsequently won with a time of 2:07.92. She then touched third in the 200 m butterfly behind Liu Zige and Mireia Belmonte. She capped off her competition with a final gold in the 400 m individual medley, finishing in 4:30.41.

2013 World Cup Series

Throughout the 2013 World Cup series, she set world records in 100-meter IM, 200-meter IM, and 400-meter IM, breaking the 200-meter record twice and 100-meter record three times.

2014
In 2014, Hosszú broke the short course world records in the 100-meter and 200-meter individual backstroke events and in 100-, 200-, and 400-meter individual medleys.

2015

2015 World Championships

At the 2015 World Championships in Kazan, Hosszú again dealt with a monster programme, competing in the 200- and 400-meter individual medley, 100- and 200-meter backstroke, 100- and 200-meter freestyle, and 200-meter butterfly. She posted the top time in the prelims of the 100-meter backstroke, but elected to pull out of the semifinal to concentrate on the 200-meter individual medley final, a decision which ultimately paid off. She broke the previous world record set by Ariana Kukors back in 2009 in a stunning time of 2:06.12. Hosszú's time of 58.78 in the prelims of the 100-meter backstroke would have earned her a bronze medal in the final; however the 200-meter individual medley final was 30 minutes after the backstroke semifinal and swimming it might have cost her the gold medal and the world record in the 200-meter individual medley. In addition, Hosszú won bronze in the 200-meter backstroke, placed fifth in the 200-meter freestyle, and capped it off with a victory in the 400-meter individual medley on the last day.

2015 European Short Course Championships
Hosszú won six gold medals at the 2015 European Short Course Championships, sweeping all three backstroke and three individual medley events. She broke world records in the 100- and 400-meter individual medleys.

2016

2016 Summer Olympics

At the 2016 Summer Olympics in Rio de Janeiro, Hosszú won the gold medal and broke the world record in the 400-meter individual medley, won the gold medal and broke the Olympic record in the 200-meter individual medley, and won a third gold medal in the 100-meter backstroke. She also won a silver in the 200-meter backstroke behind American Maya DiRado. With 3 gold medals and 1 silver, Hosszú won more medals in individual events than any other swimmer in the 2016 Summer Olympics.

2016 World Short Course Championships
In the World Short Course Championships in Windsor, Hosszú won a record 9 individual medals (7 gold and 2 silver) and reached 11 individual finals. She won the 100-, 200-, and 400-meter individual medley, 100- and 200-meter butterfly, and 100- and 200-meter backstroke. Additionally, she took silver in the 200-meter freestyle and 50-meter backstroke.

2017

2017 Swim Open Stockholm
In April, Hosszú competed in Swim Open Stockholm and won the 1500-meter freestyle event with a time of 16:22.30. She came second in the 200-meter freestyle with a time of 1:57.01, finishing behind Michelle Coleman. She also came second in the 50-meter backstroke event with a time of 28.54.

2017 World Championships

At the 2017 World Championships in her home country Hungary, Hosszú swam another rigorous schedule. She won her first gold medal in the 200-meter individual medley with a time of 2:07.00. She also won the gold medal and broke the Championships record in the 400-meter individual medley with a time of 4:29.33.

2018

2018 European Championships
At the 2018 European Championship in Glasgow Hosszú won the gold medal in the 200-meter individual medley becoming the first female swimmer to win the same event in five consecutive editions (2010-2018). She joined her compatriot László Cseh who achieved the same twice, in the 400m IM (2004-2012) and in the 200m IM (2006-2014).

2019

2019 World Championships

At the 2019 World Championships held in Gwangju, South Korea, Hosszú became the first female swimmer ever to win four straight world titles (2013-2019) in a single event (200m IM). Six days later she also won the gold medal in the 400-meter individual medley to become the first woman to win five world titles in the same event and only the second swimmer after Michael Phelps who achieved the same feat in the 200m fly.

FINA World Cup
On November the 1st Hosszú claimed her 300th overall gold medal at the FINA Swimming World Cup.

International Swimming League 
The Hosszú-owned professional swim team, Team Iron was founding member of the International Swimming League. She was co-captain of the team alongside Peter John Stevens. During the 2019 International Swimming League season, Hosszú won the 200IM, 400IM and 200 fly events all 3 times the team competed. She also earned MVP title in the ISL Budapest match in Duna Arena.

2020

2020 European Championships
At the 2020 European Championships Hosszú became the female swimmer with the most medals in the history of the European Championships. After winning one gold (400 IM) one silver (200 fly) and one bronze (200 IM) in Budapest, she now has 24 medals dating back to 2008 (15 gold, 6 silver, 3 bronze). Overall, she is ranked only behind Alexander Popov who won 26 medals (21 gold) in his European Champs career.

2020 Summer Olympics

Hosszú did not perform well in the 2020 Summer Olympics, failing to reach the 200m backstroke final and finishing only fifth in the 400m medley and seventh in the 200m one. She would attribute this to the standstill in the one year delay caused by the COVID-19 pandemic, cancelling the tournaments she entered to keep herself in competition rhythm, while analysts added that Hosszú was not helped by being among the oldest swimmers and constantly changing coaches starting with her 2018 split with Tusup.

Personal best times

Long course

Short course

International championships (50 m)

 Hosszu qualified from the heats, but scratched the semi finals
 Hosszu qualified from the semi finals, but scratched the final

See also
World record progression 100 metres backstroke
World record progression 200 metres backstroke
World record progression 100 metres individual medley
World record progression 200 metres individual medley
World record progression 400 metres individual medley

References

External links
 

1989 births
Living people
Hungarian female freestyle swimmers
Hungarian female medley swimmers
Hungarian female butterfly swimmers
Hungarian female backstroke swimmers
Olympic swimmers of Hungary
Swimmers at the 2004 Summer Olympics
Swimmers at the 2008 Summer Olympics
Swimmers at the 2012 Summer Olympics
Swimmers at the 2016 Summer Olympics
Sportspeople from Pécs
World Aquatics Championships medalists in swimming
Medalists at the FINA World Swimming Championships (25 m)
European Aquatics Championships medalists in swimming
World record holders in swimming
Olympic gold medalists for Hungary
Medalists at the 2016 Summer Olympics
Hungarian female breaststroke swimmers
Olympic silver medalists for Hungary
Olympic gold medalists in swimming
Olympic silver medalists in swimming
University of Southern California alumni
Swimmers at the 2020 Summer Olympics
21st-century Hungarian women
USC Trojans women's swimmers